The 2019–20 Furman Paladins men's basketball team represented Furman University in the 2019–20 NCAA Division I men's basketball season. The Paladins, led by third-year head coach Bob Richey, played their home games at Timmons Arena in Greenville, South Carolina as members of the Southern Conference. They finished the season 25–7, 15–3 in SoCon play to finish in second place. They lost in the quarterfinals of the SoCon tournament to Wofford. Although having 25 wins and being a strong candidate for postseason play, all post season tournaments were cancelled amid the COVID-19 pandemic.

Previous season
The Paladins finished the 2018–19 season 25–8 overall, 13–5 in SoCon play to finish in a tie for 3rd place. In the SoCon tournament, they defeated Mercer in the quarterfinals, before losing to UNC Greensboro in the semifinals. They received an at-large bid to the NIT, where they lost to Wichita State in the first round.

For a brief period during the season, Furman was nationally ranked, placing as high as 23rd in December 2018.

Roster

Schedule and results

|-
!colspan=12 style=| Non-conference regular season

|-
!colspan=9 style=| SoCon regular season

|-
!colspan=12 style=| SoCon tournament
|-

|-

Source

References

Furman Paladins men's basketball seasons
Furman Paladins
Furman Paladins men's basketball
Furman Paladins men's basketball